Yakov Leybovich Fishman (20 March 1913 – 4 June 1983) served as the Chief Rabbi of the Moscow Choral Synagogue from 1972 to 1983.

Fishman studied at the rabbinical seminary of Moscow. His wife and children were murdered by Nazis during World War II. In 1972, after the death of Leib Levin, Fishman was elected the chief rabbi of Moscow. In 1976, he was a member of the delegation of religious leaders led by Bishop  Juvenal that visited the US. In interviews to the US press he denied there was religious persecution in the Soviet Union. Thanks to the visit, a number of young Jews got the opportunity to study at the rabbinical seminary of Budapest, the only such institution in the Communist bloc countries.

On 28 April 1983, Yakov Fishman joined the "Anti-Zionist Committee of the Soviet Public".

He died of a heart attack on 4 June 1983 in Moscow.

References

Sources 
 http://www.jta.org/1983/06/07/archive/rabbi-jacob-fishman-dead-at-70

1913 births
1983 deaths
Anti-Zionist Orthodox rabbis
Chief rabbis of Russia
Jewish anti-Zionism in the Soviet Union
Modern Orthodox rabbis
Orthodox rabbis from Russia
Soviet rabbis
Rabbis from Moscow